Shahzad Bashir is the Aga Khan Professor of Islamic Humanities and Professor of Religious Studies at Brown University.

Biography
Bashir obtained his BA from Amherst College, and his MA, MPhil and PhD from Yale University. His works are concerned with history and historiography, Persian poetry, Sufism and Shi'ism, messianic movements originating in Islamic contexts, and religious representations of corporeality.  He is the associate editor of the journal History and Theory, the editor of the book series Islamic Humanities (University of California Press), and the coeditor of Islamicate Intellectual History (Brill) with Judith Pfeiffer and Heidrun Eichner.

Works
 Fazlallah Astarababi and the Hurufis
 Messianic Hopes and Mystical Visions: The Nūrbakhshīya Between Medieval and Modern Islam
 Sufi Bodies: Religion and Society in Medieval Islam
 Dance as Third Space: Interreligious, Intercultural, and Interdisciplinary Debates on Dance and Religion(s)

References

Brown University faculty
Year of birth missing (living people)
Living people
Amherst College alumni
Yale University alumni
History journal  editors